Francisco González may refer to:

Sports
Francisco González (athlete), Mexican hammer thrower
Francisco González (fencer) (born 1893), Spanish Olympic fencer
Francisco González (footballer, born 1951), Paraguayan midfielder
Francisco González (footballer, born 1984), Mexican goalkeeper
Francisco González (footballer, born 1988), Mexican midfielder
Francisco González (footballer, born 2001), Argentine forward
Francisco González (tennis) (born 1955), Paraguayan tennis player
Francisco González (volleyball) (born 1947), Mexican volleyball player
Francisco González Metilli (born 1997), Argentine footballer
Francisco Javier González Muñoz (born 1989), Spanish footballer
Francisco Javier González Pérez (born 1969), Spanish footballer known as "Fran"
Francisco Manuel González Verjaga (born 1998), Spanish footballer

Literature
Francisco González Bocanegra (1824–1861), Mexican poet, wrote lyrics of the Mexican national anthem
Francisco González Ledesma, Spanish journalist and novelist, winner of the Premio Planeta de Novela in 1984

Other fields
Francisco González (banker), chairman and chief executive of BBVA
Francisco González (game designer), American independent game designer
Francisco González de la Vega e Iriarte (1901–1976), Mexican lawyer and politician
Francisco González Gómez (1918–1990), Spanish caricaturist, painter and sculptor
Francisco González Guinán (1841–1932), Venezuelan politician, journalist, lawyer, and historian
Francisco González Valer (born 1939), Spanish-American Roman Catholic prelate
Francisco González Vargas (born 1956), Mexican politician
Pacific Air Lines Flight 773, a flight hijacked and brought down by a suicidal man named Francisco Gonzalez

See also
González (surname)